This is a list of episodes from the reality television series Cajun Pawn Stars, which airs on the cable network History.

Series overview
{| class="wikitable"
|-
! colspan="2"|Season !! Episodes !! Season Premiere !! Season Finale
|-
|  style="background:#B30713; height:5px;"|
| style="text-align:center;"| 1
| style="text-align:center;"| 8
| style="text-align:center;"| 
| style="text-align:center;"| 
|-
|  style="background:#F86FB4; height:5px;"|
| style="text-align:center;"| 2
| style="text-align:center;"| 17
| style="text-align:center;"| 
| style="text-align:center;"| 
|-
|  style="background:#689BCD; height:5px;"|
| style="text-align:center;"| 3
| style="text-align:center;"| 20
| style="text-align:center;"| 
| style="text-align:center;"| 
|-
|  style="background:#37BC61; height:5px;"|
| style="text-align:center;"| 4
| style="text-align:center;"| 7
| style="text-align:center;"| 
| style="text-align:center;"| 
|}

Episodes

Season 1

Season 2

Season 3

Season 4

References

Lists of American reality television series episodes
Pawn Stars
Lists of American non-fiction television series episodes
Louisiana-related lists